Berlin, Berlin is a 2020 romantic comedy film directed by Franziska Meyer Price, written by David Safier and starring Felicitas Woll, Jan Sosniok, and Matthias Klimsa.

It is a sequel to the television series Berlin, Berlin (2002–2005).

Cast

Release 
Berlin, Berlin was released on May 8, 2020.

References

External links
 
 

2020 films
2020 romantic comedy films
German romantic comedy films
2020s German-language films
German-language Netflix original films
Films based on television series
Films set in Berlin
2020s German films